In the 1984–85 season, Athlitiki Enosi Larissa F.C. competed in the Greek league, the Greek Cup and in the UEFA Cup Winners' Cup.

Players

Squad information

Competitions

Alpha Ethniki

Classification

European Cup Winners' Cup

First round

|}

Second round

|}

Quarter-finals

|}

Greek Cup

Final
The 43rd Greek Cup Final was played at the Athens Olympic Stadium "Spyridon Louis".

Athlitiki Enosi Larissa F.C. seasons
Larissa